Lenox Library may refer to:

Lenox Library (Massachusetts), a public library located in Lenox, Massachusetts
Lenox Library (New York City), a former library founded by James Lenox which was a predecessor of the New York Public Library